Conasprella puncticulata is a species of sea snail, a marine gastropod mollusk in the family Conidae, the cone snails and their allies.

Like all species within the family Conidae, these snails are predatory and venomous. They are capable of "stinging" humans, therefore live ones should be handled carefully or not at all.

Subspecies
 Conasprella puncticulata columba (Hwass in Bruguière, 1792) (synonym: Conus columba Hwass in Bruguière, 1792
 Conasprella puncticulata puncticulata (Hwass in Bruguière, 1792)

Distribution
This species occurs in the Caribbean Sea and off the Lesser Antilles.

Description 
The maximum recorded shell length is 32 mm.

The shell is rather broad-shouldered and somewhat swollen above, slightly contracted and grooved towards the base. Its color is whitish, encircled by numerous lines of close, small chestnut spots, and 
often clouded longitudinally with light violaceous or chestnut, forming three obscure bands. The aperture is white or violaceous.

Habitat 
Minimum recorded depth is 0 m. Maximum recorded depth is 15 m.

References

External links
 The Conus Biodiversity website
 Cone Shells – Knights of the Sea
 Puillandre N., Duda T.F., Meyer C., Olivera B.M. & Bouchet P. (2015). One, four or 100 genera? A new classification of the cone snails. Journal of Molluscan Studies. 81: 1–23

puncticulata
Gastropods described in 1792